Irvineia voltae is a species of schilbid catfish endemic to the lower Volta River in Ghana. This species grows to a length of  SL. They are oviparous and do not guard their eggs.

Conservation
I. voltae is classified as an endangered species by IUCN; in Ghana there is a conservation policy in place for the species.

References

Endemic fauna of Ghana
Schilbeidae
Endemic freshwater fish of Ghana
Fish described in 1943